Tatia Mikadze (born 27 March 1988) is a Georgian former professional tennis player.

Her career-high singles ranking is world No. 281, achieved on 13 September 2010. On 6 June 2011, she peaked at No. 255 in the doubles rankings. Mikadze won three singles and five doubles titles on the ITF Circuit.

She qualified as a lucky loser for the main draw of the Baku Cup, an event of the 2011 WTA Tour, and defeated Nina Khrisanova 6–0, 6–0, to advance to the second round.

ITF finals

Singles: 5 (3–2)

Doubles: 11 (5–6)

References

External links
 
 
 

1988 births
Sportspeople from Tbilisi
Female tennis players from Georgia (country)
Living people